Russ Lane (born September 21, 1996) is an professional stock car racing driver. He last competed part-time in the ARCA Menards Series, driving the No. 69 for Kimmel Racing.

Racing career

National Auto Sport Association 
At the age of 18, he would first race in the National Auto Sport Association, driving a Ford Mustang. He would win the American Iron division in 2019.

ARCA Menards Series 
With help of Toyota Racing Development employee Jack Irving, Lane was able to buy a car from Venturini Motorsports to race in a future ARCA Menards Series race. While looking for a location to store the car, Empire Racing would offer Lane a mechanic job for the team. He would first make his debut at the 2020 General Tire #AnywhereIsPossible 200, retiring in 17th due to a busted oil line. He would then suffer a crash at the 2020 Dutch Boy 150, finishing last in 18th. He would then get a new car for the 2020 General Tire 100, finishing 16th.

Lane would race two races in 2021 for Kimmel Racing, finishing 11th and 21st in the first and second races he raced, respectively.

Motorsports career results

ARCA Menards Series 
(key) (Bold – Pole position awarded by qualifying time. Italics – Pole position earned by points standings or practice time. * – Most laps led.)

References 

1996 births
Living people
ARCA Menards Series drivers
NASCAR drivers
Racing drivers from Kansas
Sportspeople from Kansas